José Horacio Villegas (born 13 February 1969) is a Colombian weightlifter. He competed in the men's featherweight event at the 1992 Summer Olympics.

References

External links
 

1969 births
Living people
Colombian male weightlifters
Olympic weightlifters of Colombia
Weightlifters at the 1992 Summer Olympics
Central American and Caribbean Games medalists in weightlifting
Place of birth missing (living people)
20th-century Colombian people
21st-century Colombian people